Aşağı Zurnabad is a village in the municipality of Zurnabad in the Goygol Rayon of Azerbaijan.

References

Populated places in Goygol District